Notable people with the name Valdo include:

Given name
Valdo Alhinho (born 1988), Angolan footballer
Valdo Filho (born 1964), Brazilian footballer
Valdo Randpere (born 1958), Estonian musician, businessman and politician
Valdo Spini (born 1946), Italian politician
Valdo H. Viglielmo (1926–2016), American scholar and translator of Japanese literature
Valdo Williams (1928–2010), American jazz pianist
Valdo Zeqaj (born 1994), Albanian footballer

Surname
Muntu Valdo (born 1977), Cameroonian musician
Peter Valdo (c. 1140 – c. 1218), founder of the Waldensians

Nickname
Erivaldo Antonio Saraiva (born 1980), also known as Valdo, Brazilian footballer
Valmiro Lopes Rocha (born 1981), known as Valdo, Cape Verdean footballer
Valdomiro Soares Eggres (born 1984), known as Valdo, Brazilian footballer
Andrevaldo de Jesus Santos (born 1992), known as Valdo, Brazilian footballer

Estonian masculine given names